The 1931 Stanford football team represented Stanford University in the 1931 college football season. Their head coach was Pop Warner in his eighth season. The team played its home games at Stanford Stadium in Stanford, California. This was the first year the team was officially known as the "Indians." The team had been referred to by that nickname for some time, but the mascot was officially adopted by a unanimous vote by the Executive Committee for the Associated Students at the end of the previous football season.

Stanford's end-of-season game against Dartmouth at Harvard Stadium remains the only time the team played in that stadium; a planned game at Harvard in 1950 was canceled.

Schedule

References

Stanford
Stanford Cardinal football seasons
Stanford Indians football